The murder of Yangjie Li, a Chinese architecture student, occurred sometime during 11–13 May 2016 in Saxony-Anhalt, Germany. The event generated substantial media attention in Mainland China. A German man, Sebastian Flech, was convicted of the murder in 2017. The accused's parents are police officers, and it was suspected the police may have acted to suppress evidence.

Victim
The victim, Yangjie Li, was a 25-year-old Chinese architecture student at the Anhalt University of Applied Sciences in (Dessau, Köthen, Bernburg). She studied at the School of Civil Engineering at the Henan University of Science and Technology in her hometown in Henan province, China.

Death

On Wednesday, May 11, Li left her home in Johannisstraße in downtown Dessau-Roßlau to go jogging and did not return. She wore black pants, a white-gray shirt, and black sneakers, and followed her usual running route across the city, through Dessau's city park and the museum district.

The next day, German police received a missing person report after her disappearance and mobilized hundreds of police officers in the city to search for the student. Meanwhile, many Chinese people posted messages online in social media channels, such as WeChat, about the missing student. Local Chinese also reported the missing student to the Chinese Embassy in Berlin for help.

On Friday, May 13, the police search focused on the Anhalt Theatre and the Friedensplatz area. Eventually, a naked female body was found in a bush in Hausmannstraße, near Friedensplatz. The area was immediately cordoned off. The body had such severe wounds on the head and face that immediate identification was impossible.  Rudolf Lückmann,  professor at the Anhalt University of Applied Sciences, later described her condition, saying "Her mouth, along with the face, is brutally smashed off. Her disfigured body is covered with wounds from a hard struggle for survival."

Investigation
On May 16, the forensic medical examination confirmed that the body was the missing student, Li, and also found at least one trace of foreign DNA on the body. On May 19, the existence of foreign DNA traces was confirmed. Samples were passed on to the Federal Criminal Police Office for comparison but no match was found.

On Monday, May 23, a young local couple, Sebastian F. (20), the son and step-son of a senior official of the National Police and the Dessau police chief, and his fiancée, Xenia I. (20), handed themselves in to police. The two claimed that the DNA found on the body of the victim could have come from them, and that they had met Li the night before her disappearance and had engaged in consensual sex in their apartment building next to the location where the body was found. The two claimed to have not left the apartment after the meeting with Li (which was contradicted by eyewitnesses’ testimonies who said Li had been seen elsewhere during the time of the purported meeting with the two. While the two denied any involvement in the murder, police made a successful DNA match and issued an arrest warrant for the two on suspicion of joint murder.

Ramona S., the mother of the accused, and her partner, Jörg S., both police officers, came under general suspicion of covering up evidence of the murder in the couple's apartment. The mother, working for the police department Sachsen-Anhalt East, had protected her son previously during several criminal investigations by the local police, which was headed by her husband. She volunteered to join the investigating group "Anhalt". The stepfather was the head of the Dessau police station from November 2012 until June 6, 2016, when he was barred from official duties (without disciplinary procedure). Specifically, they allegedly helped the suspects empty the apartment on Saturday, May 21. The investigation was therefore transferred from the Dessau police to the police in Halle.

At a press conference on Tuesday, May 24, following the arrest of the two suspects, the Dessau-Roßlau chief prosecutor Folker Bittmann repeated the version of events given by the two suspects that there had been a meeting with Li for consensual sex, an assertion contradicted by testimony of witnesses. The spread of the suspect's version outraged the parents of the murdered daughter, as well as Chinese students in Dessau and throughout Germany. It was thought to damage the reputation of the victim, her parents and her family in China, and also became a headline in the leading newspapers and social media in China, where the potential for justice in the German legal system was cast into doubt.

The parents of the victim presented a disciplinary complaint against Bittmann; however the Justice Department has so far seen no reason to employ a different prosecutor than Bittmann. Bittmann has also been responsible for the Oury Jalloh case for years. Oury Jalloh was a refugee from Sierra Leone who died in 2005 during a fire in a cell in the Dessau police station. During the course of the investigation, evidence disappeared, traces were erased, and police documents were destroyed.

Reactions
On Wednesday, May 18, 600 Chinese students and many others gathered at the Seminarplatz to take part in a mourning rally. About 150 local people in Dessau, including many students, took part in a memorial night run from the city park in memory of the murdered Li.
The citizens of Dessau-Roßlau (population: 79.354 (31. Dez. 2020)) donated an amount of 4,000 euros to Li Yangjie's family at the end of May 2016 (less than five cents per capita).

Trial and verdict
The murder trial took place from the end of November 2016 until February 2017. On August 4, 2017, the regional court Dessau-Roßlau sentenced Sebastian F. to life imprisonment for the murder and rape of Yangjie Li. The court stressed that the aggravating circumstances of the crime would exclude the culprit from the possibility for parole after 15 years in prison. His accomplice, Xenia I., was sentenced to five and a half years in prison for sexual assault. In addition, both culprits have to pay a total amount of €60,000 in damages,. Immediately after the verdict, the criminal defense lawyer of Sebastian F. as well as the parents of the victim announced that they would appeal the verdict. The public prosecutor appealed the verdict. Both appeals were rejected by the Federal Court of Justice in August and September 2018 and the decisions became final.

References

External links
Video of the press conference by the public prosecutor Folker Bittmann
Facebook page dedicated to bringing the murder case of Li Yangjie to public attention

2016 in Germany
Murder in Saxony-Anhalt
Dessau
Chinese expatriates in Germany
2016 deaths
Chinese people murdered abroad
2016 crimes in Germany
2016 murders in Germany
Racism in Germany